Adutha Veettu Penn is a 1960 Indian Tamil-language romantic comedy film directed by Vedantam Raghavayya and written by Thanjai N. Ramaiah Dass. The film stars Anjali Devi (who co-produced the film with her husband, composer P. Adinarayana Rao), T. R. Ramachandran and K. A. Thangavelu. It is a remake of the Bengali film Pasher Bari (1952), itself based on the namesake short story by Arun Chowdhury. In Adutha Veettu Penn, a simple man wants to impress a woman he loves by singing, but since he cannot, his friend, a singer, sings in secret while the simple man merely lip syncs, and wins the woman's love. The film was released on 11 February 1960, and became a success.

Plot 

Mannaru, a simple man, falls in love with his wealthy neighbour Leela, who sings and dances well. He wants to impress her by singing, but he cannot sing. So he seeks the help of his friend, a singer who agrees. While the friend sings in secret, Mannaru merely lip syncs. Leela is charmed by what she thinks is Mannaru singing and falls in love with him. Soon the truth comes out, and the rest of the film deals with how the tangle between the lovers is solved.

Cast 
Adapted from the film's songbook and opening credits:
Male cast
 T. R. Ramachandran as Mannaru
 K. A. Thangavelu as the singer
 K. Sarangapani as Mannaru's uncle
 M. R. Santhanam
 Pakkirisami
 L. Narayana Rao as Saroja's father
 A. Karunanidhi as friend
 P. D. Sambandam as the marriage broker
 Friend Ramsami as friend
 S. Venkataraman as friend
 K. Ramu, K. Chetty, P. Ramachandra Rao

Female cast
 Anjali Devi as Leela
 C. T. Rajakantham as Leela's mother
 M. Saroja as Leela's friend
 Balakumari
 T. P. Muthulakshmi as Saroja
 Madhuri, Ranjitham, Radharani, Rita

Production 
Adutha Veettu Penn is a remake of the Bengali film Pasher Bari (1952), itself based on the namesake short story by Arun Chowdhury. The film was produced by Anjali Devi (who also starred as the female lead) and her husband P. Adinarayana Rao, who also composed the music. Anjali Devi reprised her role from Pasher Baris Telugu adaptation Pakka Inti Ammayi (1953). The film's animated opening credits were created by Dayabhai Patel. The screenplay was written by Thanjai N. Ramaiah Dass, cinematography was handled by C. Nageswara Rao, and the editing by N. S. Prakasam. While primarily in black and white, the film was partly coloured using Gevacolor.

Influences 
Although the opening credits of Adutha Veettu Penn acknowledge the source film Pasher Bari, Saritha Rao Rayachoti (writing for Scroll.in) opines that it has some similarities with Edmond Rostand's play Cyrano de Bergerac, in which the male lead Cyrano loves his cousin Roxane but feels he is not worthy of her due to his large nose; so he romances her by proxy, i.e. he writes her love letters which another man, Christian de Neuvillette, claims to be the writer of, at Cyrano's request. According to Rayachoti, the film eschewed the play's tragedy elements in favour of romantic comedy overtones.

Soundtrack 
The soundtrack album was composed by P. Adinarayana Rao, with lyrics were by Thanjai N. Ramaiah Dass. The song "Vanitha Maniye" is set in the Hamsadhvani raga, while "Kannale Pesi Pesi Kolladhe" is set in Keeravani, and "Kangalum Kavi Paaduthe" is set in Hindolam. The album was a major breakthrough for P. B. Sreenivas, who sang five of the film's songs. According to The Hindus B. Kolappan, the film "proved beyond doubt that Sreenivas was going to secure an established place in Tamil film music."

Release and reception 
Adutha Veettu Penn was released on 11 February 1960. A review from the magazine Ananda Vikatan, dated 27 March 1960, called the film a must-watch for the comedy and dance sequences which were in colour. Kanthan of Kalki said no one could have done the role of Mannaru better than Ramachandran. According to historian Randor Guy, it was a major commercial success primarily because of its full-length situational comedy, then a rarity in Indian cinema and more so in Tamil.

References

Bibliography

External links 
 

1960 films
1960 romantic comedy films
1960s Tamil-language films
Films about fraud
Films based on adaptations
Films directed by Vedantam Raghavayya
Films scored by P. Adinarayana Rao
Indian romantic comedy films
Tamil remakes of Bengali films